"Notturno" (translated as Nocturne), Opus 44, Number 1 (TrV 197), is an orchestral song written for low voice, which Richard Strauss composed in 1899 based on a poem Erscheinung (translated as Apparition) by the German poet Richard Dehmel (1863-1920).  In performance it takes about 13 minutes.  Norman Del Mar described it as “ranking amongst Strauss’s finest as well as more ambitious works”.

Composition history
Strauss wrote two “large songs for low voice and orchestral accompaniment” (German ): Notturno being the first and Nächtlicher Gang the second. Strauss described his two songs in correspondence with his father Franz Strauss as “Baritone songs”. The song was dedicated to the Dutch baritone Anton von Rooy.  It was premiered on December 3, 1900, in Berlin, with the composer conducting the Berlin Royal Court Opera with baritone Baptist Hoffmann.

The orchestration is for strings and wind, with no percussion and “just three trombones for their sombre quality”. Strauss, had only recently taken up his duties as chief conductor of the Berlin Royal Court Opera (where he served from 1898 to 1908), finishing the composition of the song at his home in Charlottenburg on 11 July 1899 and the full scoring two months later on 16 September. Otto Singer Jr. made a reduction for piano, violin and voice in the same year.

Strauss set 11 poems by the German poet Richard Dehmel over the period 1895–1901. Dehmel was a controversial figure in the Germany of Kaiser Wilhelm II, a socialist who had been convicted for blasphemy in Berlin during 1897. He was the same age as Strauss, and “Dehmel worked squarely within the aesthetic territory occupied by Strauss”. Whilst Strauss had little interest in the politics of Dehmel, he shared the Nietzschean perspective that human lives are lived among and controlled by physical forces.  Whilst the two had corresponded for several years, they first met on March 23, 1899 (Hugo von Hofmannsthal was accompanying Dehmel, and also met Strauss for the first time).

Dehmel's poem Erscheinung (Apparition) was published in his 1891 collection Erlösungen (Deliverance or Salvation), and in a letter to Strauss Dehmel described it as a “Romance apparition”. Dehmel's poem “tells the tale of the vision in a dream where Death appears in the shape of a much loved friend  who appears in bright moonshine at deepest night playing a supplicating air on his violin”. Strauss adapted the poem and renamed in Notturno. In particular, in Dehmel's poem the “apparition” is a dream and ends with a thankful awakening. Strauss omitted the first stanza and the last line of the poem,   so that the apparition stands on its own. As Del Mar commented, “if the omissions render the meaning of the verses as a whole more obscure, they add to the mystic quality”.  Dehmel himself found the setting much to his liking: “Of Strauss’s compositions on texts of my songs, I like best Lied an meinem Sohn and Nottorno…” In fact Dehmel later revised Erscheinung and introduced some of the changes made by Strauss - including the title Notturno.  In the posthumous collection of his poems edited by his second wife (Ida Dehmel), the first verse and last line are also left out rendering it almost the same as the Strauss lyrics.

Lyrics

The lyrics of the song follow quite closely the 1891 version of Dehmel's poem Erscheinung. The major difference is in the omission of the first stanza, and the last line when the narrator awakes up from the dream "und seufzend bin ich aufgewach" (and sighing I awoke). There are also some minor changes of adjectives and word orderings. This is the version as in the score.

References
Notes

Sources

Norman Del Mar, Richard Strauss. A Critical Commentary on his Life and Works, Volume 3, London: Faber and Faber (2009)[1968] (second edition), .
Schuh, W. Richard Strauss: A Chronicle of the Early Years 1864-1898, (translated by Mary Wittal), Cambridge University Press, 1982. .

External sources

 Paul Thomas: Richard Strauss — Notturno, Opus 44, No.1

Songs by Richard Strauss
1899 songs